Herod is an American heavy metal band. The band was formed in 2000 in Buffalo, New York, United States, by Jesse Benker and Mike Jeffers, formerly of the band Dead to the World. Their first release was Sinner's in the Eyes of an Angry God in 2001, followed by Execution Protocol in early 2002, through Too Damn Hype Records. In 2003, the band was signed by Lifeforce Records. Since being signed, the band has released two albums with Lifeforce, the first being For Whom the Gods Would Destroy in 2004. Jason Russo replaced vocalist Judah Nero in 2005. Shortly afterward the band went into the studio to record their second album with Lifeforce Records, Rich Man's War, Poor Man's Fight, with producer Doug White. The record was released in March 2006. In late 2008, Herod joined Dark Harvest Records and began recording their label debut, Curse of the King, and follow up Self Titled EP.

Band members

Current
Jesse Benker – vocals and lead guitar
Andy Huefner – bass
Mike "Union" Jeffers – drums

Former
Jason Russo – vocals
Nate Seibel – vocals
Bryce March – guitar
Chuck Palisano – guitar
Jeremy Partlow – bass
Judah Nero – vocals
Tom Broucksou – bass
Greg DiPasquale – guitar
Matt Backlass – bass

Discography
Sinners in the Eyes of an Angry God (2001)
Execution Protocol (2002)
For Whom the Gods Would Destroy (2004)
Rich Man's War, Poor Man's Fight (2006)
Curse of the King (2009)
Self Titled (EP) (2013)
Split 7" (2014)

References

External links
 The band's page on LIFEFORCERECORDS.com 
 HEROD – Dark Harvest Records

Musical groups established in 2000
American thrash metal musical groups
Heavy metal musical groups from New York (state)